Xander Houtkoop (born 26 March 1989) is a Dutch former professional footballer who plays as a winger. He formerly played for FC Emmen, Heracles Almelo, Go Ahead Eagles and ADO Den Haag. Houtkoop is known for his speed, creativity, close control and flair.

Playing career

Heerenveen, Emmen and Heracles 
Houtkoop began his career as a bencher at SC Heerenveen in the Eredivisie, failing to register an appearance. In the summer of 2009, Houtkoop signed a season-long loan with FC Emmen in the Eerste Divisie.

After an impressive campaign in Emmen, Houtkoop attracted the interest of Eredivisie-club Heracles Almelo. Following intense speculation surrounding his future, Houtkoop signed a two-year contract at Heracles Almelo in April 2010 after his contract at Heerenveen had expired. He had six caps for the club.

Go Ahead, ADO and Cambuur 
In July 2011, Houtkoop signed with Go Ahead Eagles after his Heracles contract expired. With Go Ahead, he had 93 caps and 21 goals, helping Go Ahead return to the Eredivisie. In the summer of 2014, Houtkoop signed a two-year contract with ADO Den Haag. Here he had three goals. Houtkoop had the misfortune to score one goal against his own team in a game against Ajax.

In August 2015, Houtkoop signed a three-year deal with SC Cambuur on a free transfer. Houtkoop's three-year contract with ADO Den Haag was dissolved to allow this move. On 25 January 2017, Houtkoop was one of two Cambuur players to miss a penalty, after a 2016–17 KNVB Cup game against FC Utrecht ended 2–2. Cambuur won away, as three Utrecht players had missed. The contract with Cambuur expired in the summer of 2018.

HamKam, New Zealand and Jubbega 
Houtkoop went to Hamarkameratene that played in the Norwegian First Division on trial. On 29 August 2018, he signed with the club for one season. His first game for HamKam was a 2–1 victory at home against Åsane on 2 September, where Houtkoop came on as a substitute for Abubakar Ibrahim in the second half. In total, Houtkoop played seven league games for HamKam. 

After this adventure in Norway, Houtkoop had an internship in New Zealand, before refusing an offer from Canada. On 1 September 2019, Houtkoop joined VV Jubbega. Houtkoop was recruited to Jubbenga by its head coach Inne Schotanus, who was his trainer in the SC Heerenveen youth. In his first game for Jubbega, entering as a substitute, it managed to beat GOMOS 6–7 including 2 goals and 2 assists by Houtkoop, after GOMOS had led this cup game 6–2 and Jubbega had one player less due to a red card.

Personal 
Houtkoop is married. He is partially of Indonesian descent.

References

External links
 Voetbal International profile 

1989 births
Living people
Dutch footballers
Dutch expatriate footballers
SC Heerenveen players
FC Emmen players
Heracles Almelo players
Go Ahead Eagles players
ADO Den Haag players
SC Cambuur players
Hamarkameratene players
Norwegian First Division players
Eredivisie players
Eerste Divisie players
Dutch people of Indonesian descent
Association football wingers
Expatriate footballers in Norway
Dutch expatriate sportspeople in Norway
Footballers from Almere